Sonia Petro is a politician from Guadeloupe, who is the Head of List and a member of the political party, The Republicans. She has also served as the President of the Federation of Republicans of Guadeloupe. She was appointed Deputy Mayor of Basse-Terre in 2020. In 2022 she was appointed Overseas Speaker on behalf of the presidential candidate Valérie Pécresse.

References 

Living people
Year of birth missing (living people)
Guadeloupean women
Guadeloupean politicians
Guadeloupean women in politics
The Republicans (France) politicians
21st-century French women politicians